The Ardwick train depot is a passenger multiple unit maintenance depot in Ardwick, Greater Manchester. The depot was opened in 2006 for the servicing of Siemens-built Class 185 DMUs, which are used on the TransPennine Express franchise. It was electrified in 2012–13 to allow the servicing of Siemens Class 350/4 EMUs.

Location

The depot code is AK.

History

In the 1840s, the Sheffield, Ashton-under-Lyne and Manchester Railway was constructed between Manchester Store Street station (now known as Manchester Piccadilly) and Sheffield Victoria railway station. Initially, the site of the depot was just outside the urban spread of Manchester; the area was used for brick manufacture. Subsequently, the area east of Ardwick station and north of the line was used for railway sidings, including goods sheds; the wider area became known as Ardwick West Goods Depot and Mineral Yard, later Ardwick West Freight Terminal. The site remained in railway use through most of the 20th century, but became disused by 1990.

Siemens train maintenance depot
In 2003, Siemens was announced as the preferred bidder to supply and maintain a fleet of diesel multiple units for use on the TransPennine Express franchise. The £260 million contract included the provision and supply of maintenance facilities, with the primary facility in Manchester, along with a secondary depot in York. In 2004, Siemens applied to construct sidings, train facilities and offices on the Ardwick site.

The groundbreaking ceremony took place in March 2005. The depot was constructed on the  site over 13 months, being completed on 3 April 2006, at a cost of about £30m. The designers were Burks Green; Taylor Woodrow were the main contractors; and NG Bailey and Atkins Rail were subcontractors. The main shed was a  building capable of holding eight trains – a four-road shed with two three-car  trains per road – with facilities including wheel lathe, train jacks, and bogie and engine drops. The depot was officially opened on 16 May 2006 by Transport Secretary Douglas Alexander.

In February 2012, Siemens obtained a contract to build and maintain twenty Class 350 Desiro 25 kV AC electric multiple units, including ten Class 350/4 units for First TransPennine Express. The contract required the overhead electrification of the depot. Work to modify the depot began in September 2012, with Spencer Rail (Spencer Group) as the main contractor. The estimated cost of the project was £5 million.

The depot's electrification was ceremonially opened by local MP, Lucy Powell, on 27 September 2013. The first of the Class 350/4 trains arrived at the depot on 28 November 2013.

References

Notes

Sources

Railway depots in England
Rail transport in Greater Manchester
Siemens Mobility projects